The Jukunoid languages are a branch of the Benue-Congo languages spoken by the Jukun and related peoples of Nigeria and Cameroon. They are distributed mostly throughout Taraba State, Nigeria and surrounding regions.

Their asymmetrical nasal consonants are atypical for West Africa, as can be seen in Wapan.

External relationships
Gerhardt (1983) and Güldemann (2018) suggest that Jukunoid may actually be part of the Plateau languages, as it shares similarities with various Plateau groups, especially Tarokoid. However, Blench (2005) argues that Jukunoid is clearly separate from Plateau.

Classification
The following classification is from Glottolog; the Kororofa branch has been added from Ethnologue (Glottolog classifies the Kororofa languages as Jukun):
Kuteb
Central
Kpan–Icen: Etkywan (Icen), Kpan
Jukun–Mbembe–Wurbo
Jukun: Jukun (Jukun Takum), Jibu, Hõne, Wãpha, Jan Awei
Kororofa: Wannu, Wapan, Jiba
Mbembe (Tigon)
Wurbo: Como Karim, Jiru, Shoo-Minda-Nye
Ethnologue adds the Yukubenic branch of the Plateau languages as part of a Yukubenic-Kuteb group based on Shimizu (1980), and Blench also follows this classification. Ethnologue also leaves the Wurbo language Shoo-Minda-Nye as unclassified within Jukun–Mbembe–Wurbo, and includes the unclassified Benue–Congo language Tita in its place.

Lau was also recently reported by Idiatov (2017).

Names and locations
Below is a list of language names, populations, and locations from Blench (2019).

Numerals
Comparison of numerals in individual languages:

See also
List of Proto-Jukunoid reconstructions (Wiktionary)

Further reading
Shimizu, Kiyoshi. 1980. Comparative Jukunoid, 3 vols. (Veröffentlichungen der Institute für Afrikanistik und Ägyptologie der Universität Wien 7–9. Beiträge zur Afrikanistik 5–7). Vienna: Afro-Pub.

References

External links
ComparaLex, database with Jukunoid word lists

 
Benue–Congo languages